The Tejas Club is one of the oldest student organizations at the University of Texas at Austin. It was founded in 1925, and only has male members. The official purpose of the club is "to allow our members to live a more complete life by sharing their personalities, abilities and efforts to promote good fellowship and a high standard of conduct among ourselves and our fellow students, to encourage loyalty and usefulness to our school, and to further good scholarship." The membership process of the organization is secretive and not open to the public.

Establishment

The Tejas Club was formed in 1925 by Tom Renfro and Howell Cobb with the vision of establishing "a club on this campus composed of men whom we believe to be honorable."
In its early years, Tejas was associated with Theta Nu Epsilon (ΘΝΕ), a nationwide sophomore class society which also included such organizations as Skull and Bones at Yale University, The Phoenix – S K Club and Fly Club at Harvard University, and The Ivy Club at the Princeton University.

On Campus

Tejas members have always been a highly involved and diverse group of men at the University of Texas. Multiple members of the Tejas Club have served as student body presidents and vice presidents, head cheerleaders, Texas Cowboys, Silver Spurs, Texas Blazers, members of another secret organization, the Friar Society, leadership within the Longhorn Band, chairmen of the University Union board of directors, and many other important roles on campus.

The Tejas Club celebrated its 90th anniversary on September 5 and 6 of 2015. It will be celebrating its 100th anniversary in 2025.

Since the early 1930s, the Tejas Club has hosted a weekly speaker series called Tejas Coffees. As is tradition, Tejas Coffees serve as an opportunity for students to interact with influential members of their community in an inviting setting, every Thursday evening. Recent speakers have included UT professor and actor Matthew McConaughey, Texas Longhorns athletics coaches Mack Brown, Rick Barnes, Shaka Smart, Tom Herman, and Augie Garrido; Founder of Alamo Drafthouse Cinema, Tim League; Former World No. 1 tennis player, Andy Roddick; UT professors Robert Metcalfe, H.W. Brands, and Larry Speck; current UT president Gregory L. Fenves and former UT presidents William C. Powers and Larry Faulkner; former University of Texas System chancellor Mark Yudof; former Secretary of the Air Force Hans Mark; former National Security Agency director Bobby Ray Inman; Celebrity Chef, Tyson Cole; Whole Foods CEO, John Mackey; Cyclist Lance Armstrong, and Texas politicians Beto O'Rourke, Wendy Davis, James Talarico, Christi Craddick, Kel Seliger, and Carole Keeton Strayhorn among others.

Alumni

Many notable alumni of the University of Texas are Tejas Braves. The Tejas Foundation was created in 1953 to establish communication between former and current members of the club. To this day, the alumni of Tejas continue to be involved with helping the club provide housing, encourage scholarship, and organize various events.

Alumni of the Tejas Club include:
 Harley Clark, former judge, attorney, and UT student body president; creator of the "Hook 'em Horns" hand sign.
 Frank C. Cooksey, former Mayor of Austin, Texas. 
Robert H. Dedman, Sr., former billionaire, founder and chairman of ClubCorp, and owner of the Pinehurst Resort.
 Michael L. Gillette, author, historian, and non-profit executive.
 W. Page Keeton, former attorney and dean of the University of Texas School of Law.
 Royce C. Lamberth, current Senior Judge and former Chief Judge of the United States District Court for the District of Columbia.
 Austin Ligon, co-founder and former president and CEO of CarMax.
 Steve Poizner, 6th Insurance Commissioner of California, businessman, entrepreneur, and Independent politician.
 Rex Tillerson, former United States Secretary of State, former chairman, president, and CEO of Exxon Mobil Corporation.
 Malcolm Wallace, former UT student body president, economist for the United States Department of Agriculture, and press secretary to then-United States Senator Lyndon B. Johnson.
 Thomas Morrow Reavley, former Senior United States Circuit Judge of the United States Court of Appeals for the Fifth Circuit.
 Ronnie Earle - American politician and judge who was, from January 1977 to January 2009, the District Attorney for Travis County, Texas.

Entry Process 
 Similar to the Final Clubs at Harvard University, the process for becoming a "Newman" is highly secretive and not shared with non-members. Each class of Newmen typically consists of anywhere from 6 to 12 members, who are publicly honored at their Newman Honorary, a public event held at the Tejas House.

See also
 Collegiate secret societies in North America

References

External links

Collegiate secret societies
Student societies in the United States
Student organizations established in 1925
University of Texas at Austin
1925 establishments in Texas